Cyclanthus bipartitus a species of plant in the family Cyclanthaceae, first described as a genus in 1824. It is native to southern Mexico, Central America, Trinidad, Windward Islands, northern South America (Venezuela, the Guianas, Colombia, Ecuador, Peru, Bolivia, northwestern Brazil).

References

Cyclanthaceae
Flora of South America
Flora of Central America
Flora of Mexico
Flora of the Caribbean
Plants described in 1824
Flora without expected TNC conservation status